Lachnoloma is a genus of flowering plants belonging to the family Brassicaceae.

Its native range is Iran to Xinjiang.

Species:
 Lachnoloma lehmannii Bunge

References

Brassicaceae
Brassicaceae genera
Taxa named by Alexander von Bunge